Dobřív is a municipality and village in Rokycany District in the Plzeň Region of the Czech Republic. It has about 1,300 inhabitants. The historic centre is well preserved and is protected by law as a village monument zone.

Administrative parts
The village of Pavlovsko is an administrative part of Dobřív.

Geography
It lies in the Brdy Highlands. The eastern part of the municipal territory belongs to the Brdy Protected Landscape Area and includes several other hills with an altitude of more than 600 m. The Klabava River flows through the municipality.

History
The first written mention of Dobřív is from 1325.

Sights
Dobřív is known for its hammer mill, very rare example of a fully functioning water powered forge. The earliest record of a smelter is Dobřív is from 1505 and existence of hammer mills is proven since 1614.

Swedish Stone Bridge is a technical monument from the 17th century. It has one seven-metre arch with a height of 4 metres. On the bridge is a statue of a woman, which is probably Saint Barbara, and in front of the bridge is a statue of St. John of Nepomuk from the 18th century.

References

External links

Villages in Rokycany District